Kalle Johansson (born January 21, 1993) is a Swedish professional ice hockey player who is currently playing for IF Björklöven in the HockeyAllsvenskan (Allsv).

Playing career
He made his top flight Swedish Hockey League debut in the 2018–19 season, as a 25-year old, with the Växjö Lakers. After 18 games, posting 2 assists, and a loan to IK Oskarshamn of the HockeyAllsvenskan, Johansson left Sweden during the midpoint of the year joining Austrian club, Graz 99ers of the EBEL for the remainder of the season on 3 January 2019.

Awards and honours
2011 IIHF World U18 Championships (Silver Medal with Team Sweden)

References

External links

1993 births
Living people
Graz 99ers players
IK Oskarshamn players
Swedish ice hockey defencemen
Tingsryds AIF players
Växjö Lakers players
People from Östersund
Sportspeople from Jämtland County